Dušan Trifunović (1 March 1880 – 28 February 1942) was a divisional general in the Royal Yugoslav Army who commanded the 7th Army during the German-led Axis invasion of Yugoslavia of April 1941 during World War II. Trifunović's command consisted of one division, one divisional-strength mountain detachment, two brigade-strength mountain detachments and a brigade-strength infantry detachment. The 7th Army was responsible for the defence of the northwestern border with Italy and the Third Reich.

Notes

Footnotes

References

Books

Web

 
 

1880 births
1942 deaths
People from Svilajnac
People from the Principality of Serbia
Royal Yugoslav Army personnel of World War II
World War II prisoners of war held by Germany